Edgar Bruun (4 August 1905 – 30 October 1985) was a Norwegian race walker.

Achievements

External links
Norwegian international athletes - B

1905 births
1985 deaths
Norwegian male racewalkers

Athletes (track and field) at the 1936 Summer Olympics
Athletes (track and field) at the 1948 Summer Olympics
Athletes (track and field) at the 1952 Summer Olympics
Olympic athletes of Norway
World record setters in athletics (track and field)
European Athletics Championships medalists
20th-century Norwegian people